Azarychy is a town in Kalinkavichy District, Gomel Region, Belarus.

History
The village had an important Jewish community.
Germans occupied the town from November 1941 to January 1944 and built 3 camps. Between 9,000 and 13,000 of the up to 50,000 imprisoned Belarusian and Russian men, women and children did not survive their incarceration at the camps.

References

Populated places in Gomel Region
Urban-type settlements in Belarus
Minsk Voivodeship
Bobruysky Uyezd